Infantile acropustulosis  is an intensely itchy vesicopustular eruption of the hands and feet.

Involvement of scabies has been suggested. infantile acropustulosis is characterized by itchy papules and vesicles that are similar to those found in scabies "mosquito like bites" but there is absence of the typical burrowing with S like burrows on the skin and can occur in small babies as opposed to scabies mostly found on children and young adults.

See also 
 Acropustulosis
 List of cutaneous conditions

References

External links 

Recalcitrant palmoplantar eruptions